Kim Marie Carroll (born 2 September 1987) is an Australian soccer player currently playing in the W-League for Perth Glory. Carroll has previously played for Brisbane Roar and Fortuna Hjørring. She has also played over 50 matches for Australia.

Early life
Carroll was born and raised in Tully, Queensland. In 2013, the Cassowary Coast Regional Council named a sporting complex in Tully the "Kim Carroll Sporting Fields" in her honour. She left home at the age of 15 to take up a scholarship with the Queensland Academy of Sport (QAS).

Playing career

Club career
Carroll played seven times for the Queensland Sting in the Women's National Soccer League (WNSL) during the 2003–04 and 2004 WNSL seasons. She also played for the Sting's grand final-winning team in the 2005 Australian National Women's Football Tournament.

Between 2008 and 2011 Carroll played for Brisbane Roar in the W-League.

In 2011 Carroll joined Fortuna Hjørring in the Danish Elitedivisionen, with whom she played in the UEFA Women's Champions League.

After returning from Denmark, Carroll re-joined Brisbane Roar in 2012. In the W-League off-season in 2013, Carroll spent time playing for Macarthur Rams in the National Premier Leagues NSW Women’s competition.

In August 2015, Carroll moved to the Perth Glory.

In November 2020, Carroll returned to Queensland, joining Brisbane Roar once again.

In June 2021, Carroll returned once more to Perth Glory.

International career
She has been a member of the Australian national team since 2005, winning the 2010 Asian Cup and taking part in the 2011 World Cup.

Career statistics

International goals
Scores and results list Australia's goal tally first.

Honours

Club
Queensland Sting
 Women's National Soccer League Championship: 2004
 Australian National Women's Football Tournament Championship: 2005

Brisbane Roar
 W-League Premiership: 2008–09
 W-League Championship: 2008–09, 2010–11

Country
Australia
 AFC Women's Asian Cup: 2010
 AFF Women's Championship: 2008
 OFC U-20 Women's Championship: 2004

References

External links

 Profile  at Perth Glory

1987 births
Living people
Australian women's soccer players
Brisbane Roar FC (A-League Women) players
Perth Glory FC (A-League Women) players
A-League Women players
2011 FIFA Women's World Cup players
Australia women's international soccer players
Women's association football defenders